Hazeliidae is an extinct family of spicular Cambrian sea sponges known from the Burgess Shale, the Marjum Formation of Utah, and possibly Chengjiang. It was described by Charles Walcott in 1920.

References 

Protomonaxonida
Ordovician invertebrates
Cambrian sponges
Prehistoric sponge families
Cambrian first appearances
Middle Ordovician extinctions